Oxon Cove Park and Oxon Cove Farm is a national historic district that includes a living farm museum operated by the National Park Service, and located at Oxon Hill, Prince George's County, Maryland. It is part of National Capital Parks-East. It was listed on the National Register of Historic Places in 2003.

The park provides an excellent resource for environmental studies, wildlife observing, fishing, and other recreational activities made possible by easy access to the Potomac River. Fourteen buildings and two structures are located in the historic district and associated with the property's sequential development as a plantation, an institutional agricultural complex, and a farm museum.

Oxon Hill Farm
The Oxon Hill Farm includes the Mount Welby home, Farm Museum, barns, a stable, feed building, livestock buildings and a visitor activity barn.  Farm animals include cows, horses and chickens.  Visitors can view the animals up close daily and learn about the workings of a farm.  The Farm Museum building displays historical farm equipment dating from the late 19th century.

The district also includes a hexagonal frame outbuilding; c. 1830 brick root cellar; c. 1973 frame hog house; c. 1890 frame horse and pony barn; c. 1991 frame chicken house; c. 1970 steel-frame implement shed; c. 1980 frame visitor barn; c. 1970 steel-frame windmill; c. 1940 frame hay barn; c. 1890 frame feed building; c. 1830 brick stable; c. 1970 frame tool shed; c. 1980 frame "sorghum sirip" shed; and a c. 1980 frame dairy barn, and c. 1940 tile silo. From the 1890s to 1950s, under the ownership of St. Elizabeth's Hospital, the site was used as a therapeutic treatment center for the mentally ill known as Godding Croft. The Oxon Cove Farm historic district is located on the crest of a ridge overlooking the Potomac River, north of I-95 and very close to National Harbor.

Mount Welby
The principal dwelling, known as "Mount Welby," is a c. 1807-1811 two-story three-bay brick structure laid in Flemish bond with Italianate detailing and sheltered by a shed roof, and visible to motorists crossing the interstate Woodrow Wilson Bridge. The house was built by Irish immigrant Dr. Samuel DeButts. It was entrusted to the National Park Service in 1959 in order to protect its resources from increased development.  From 1891 to 1950, the property was used as a therapeutic farm by St. Elizabeths Hospital, and was known as Godding Croft.

The house is operated as a historic house museum, with exhibits about period life in the early 19th century for the owners and slaves on the plantation.  Other exhibits focus on the home's role at Godding Croft.

Gallery

See also
 Open-air museum

References

External links
 National Park Service, National Capital Parks - East, Oxon Cove Park and Oxon Hill Farm website
 , including photo in 1988, at Maryland Historical Trust website
 M-NCPPC Inventory of Historic Sites (Prince George's County); Mount Welby, entry 76A-013, p. 118
 The Historical Marker Database, Oxon Cove Park and Oxon Hill Farm entry

Parks in Prince George's County, Maryland
Farm museums in Maryland
Houses on the National Register of Historic Places in Maryland
Historic districts on the National Register of Historic Places in Maryland
Museums in Prince George's County, Maryland
Protected areas established in 1959
Italianate architecture in Maryland
National Park Service areas in Maryland
National Capital Parks-East
Houses in Prince George's County, Maryland
1959 establishments in Maryland
Houses completed in 1811
National Register of Historic Places in Prince George's County, Maryland
Farms on the National Register of Historic Places in Maryland
Oxon Hill, Maryland
Southeast (Washington, D.C.)